Mount Kemul (also Kemoel, Kemal, Kongkemul, Kong Kemul) is a mountain in East Kalimantan. It is the type locality of the pitcher plant species Nepenthes fusca and Nepenthes mollis.

References

Kemul
Landforms of East Kalimantan